Lijiang, also known as Likiang, is a prefecture-level city in the northwest of Yunnan Province, China. Lijiang is famous for its UNESCO Heritage Site, the Old Town of Lijiang, which contains a mixture of different historical architecture styles and a complex, ancient water-supply system.

History

100,000 years ago, the Lijiang people of the late Paleolithic sapiens were active here. The discovery of cave paintings in the Jinsha River Valley and numerous new stone tools, bronzes and ironsmiths prove that Lijiang is one of the important areas of ancient human activities in southwest China. 

The Baisha Old Town was the political, commercial and cultural center for the local Naxi people and other ethnic groups for 400 years from the year 658 AD to 1107AD. The Dabaoji Palace of the Baisha Fresco, very close to the Baisha Naxi Hand-made Embroidery Institute, was built in the year 658 AD in the Tang dynasty (618 AD to 907 AD).

In ancient times, the Baisha Old Town used to be the center of silk embroidery in the southwest of China and the most important place of the Ancient Southern Silk Road, also called the Ancient Tea and Horse Road or Ancient tea route. The Ancient Southern Silk Road started from Burma, crossed Lijiang, Shangri-La County, Tibet, journeyed through Iran, the Fertile Crescent and ultimately to the  Mediterranean Sea.

The Kingdom of Lijiang submitted to Khubilai Khan as he led his troops against the Dali kingdom in 1253. Though the kingdom was incorporated into the Mongol empire then the Yuan dynasty, it was given the status of tusi, or indigenous office, which gave autonomy to the local Naxi rulers. During the Ming dynasty, the Naxi were one of the few border peoples to support the Ming immediately. As the Naxi helped the Ming expand in Southwest China the ruler family was given the title of Mu. During this period the Kingdom of Lijiang was able to expand into Sichuan and Tibet bringing many Tibetan peoples into its territory as well as their cultural and religious influence. It was under the rule of the Naxi ruling house of the Mu family during the Yuan (not yet named Mu), Ming, and Qing dynasties.The Mu "held this position until 1723, when Lijiang became directly incorporated under the authority of the Qing central government."

In 2002 Lijiang City was established, replacing the former Lijiang Naxi Autonomous County.

Geography and climate

Geography 

Lijiang is located in the northwestern portion of Yunnan and borders Sichuan. It is within the region encompassed by the Hengduan Mountains, where the Qinghai-Tibet Plateau and Yunnan-Guizhou Plateau converge. It borders Sichuan Liangshan Yi Autonomous Prefecture and Panzhihua City to the east, and Jianchuan, Heqing and Binchuan three of the Dali Bai Autonomous Prefecture in the south. County and Chuxiong Yi Autonomous Prefecture Dayao and Yongren counties, west and north are adjacent to Lanping County of Nujiang Yi Autonomous Prefecture and Weixi County of Diqing Tibetan Autonomous Prefecture. The city has a total area of 20,600 square kilometers and governs the ancient city, Yulong Naxi Autonomous County, Yongsheng County, Huaping County and Ninglang Yi Autonomous County.

Climate 
Owing to its low latitude and high elevation, the city centre of Lijiang experiences a mild subtropical highland climate (Köppen Cwb). Spring begins early and remains dry and sunny until late May, when there is a dramatic uptick in frequency and amount of rainfall that lasts until late September. Summers are warm, rainy (more so than it is sunny) and damp, with June, the warmest month, averaging . Autumn sees an abrupt reduction in rainfall and return to sunniness. With monthly percent possible sunshine ranging from 32% in July to 80% in December, the city receives 2,463 hours of bright sunshine annually.

Administrative divisions
The government of Lijiang City sits in Gucheng District.

Lijiang City comprises one district and four counties:

Local culture

Minority ethnic culture 
Naxi
The Naxi people have their own language. The Naxi language belongs to the Tibetan-Burmese language branch of the Sino-Tibetan language family. It is roughly divided into two dialects by the Jinsha River. The dialects cannot talk to each other. The standard language of Naxi language is based on the dialect of the western dialect of Naxi language, and the voice of Dayan Town of Lijiang City is the standard sound. In the long history of the Naxi people, there have been Dongbawen and Gobawen characters. "Dongbawen" is a hieroglyph created by the Naxi people more than a thousand years ago (before the Tang dynasty). It consists of pictographic symbols, phonetic symbols and additional symbols. It is the only living hieroglyph in the world that is still circulating in the folk. The Naxi people generally live in dam areas, river valleys and half-mountain areas. The private housing in the dam area is mostly a tiled house with civil structures. The pattern is mostly "three rooms and one wall", and the mountainous areas are mostly low wooden raft houses, which are covered with wooden boards. The Naxi people love singing and dancing, and there are often mass songs and dances in production labor and national festivals. The "Three Festivals" at the beginning of the lunar calendar in early February is the most traditional festival of the people of Lijiang Naxi.

Mosuo
Mosuo is used to living in the mountains and waters. The houses are all made of wood. The traditional festivals of the Mosuo people include the Spring Festival, the Dragon Boat Festival, the Chaoshan Festival, the Ancestor Festival, the Sacrifice God Festival, and the Festival of Land Festival. Among them, the Spring Festival and the Chaoshan Festival are the most solemn. Mosuo people can sing and dance.

Yi
The Yi people have a long history, and their ancestors are "Kunming" people who have a relationship with them. They were called "Wu Man" in the Tang and Song Dynasties. The Yi people have their own language and words. The language belongs to the Tibetan-Burmese language branch of the Sino-Tibetan language family. There are six dialects. The Xiaoliangshan Yi people belong to the northern dialect Shizha. Originally an ancient ideogram, some people think it is a pictographic syllable. In the history of the Yi people, they wrote historical, literary, astronomical and medical books, religious classics and so on. Most of the Yi villages are surrounded by mountains and waters, and the environment is beautiful. Generally, there are two or 30 households, and three or five households or single households are rare. The people living in Xiaoliangshan are generally low in order to avoid the cold of the mountains. Mostly, it is a timber frame with a multi-column landing structure. The four walls are made of wood or fenced with bamboo and wood. There are many festivals for the Yi people, such as the Lunar Festival, the 15th Festival, the February 8th, and the March 3rd Festival, especially the Torch Festival.

Lisu
The Lisu language belongs to the Sino-Tibetan language family. The Lisu people live in a high-slope area. Due to the influence of the terrain and habits, there are no villages that live in dozens of houses. Generally, there are dozens of households on two or three hills as a village. The villages are far apart, and the houses are mainly wooden rafts. The Lisu people have oral songs and long poems, as well as many myths and legends. Every December, the people of Huaping and other places will hold a grand ceremony to celebrate the "Wide Season" (New Year's Day). There are also the Dragon Boat Festival "Hangshan Festival" and Lixia "Holy Water Festival" in Lijiang Dawn Township.

Pumi
The language of the Pumi people belongs to the Yi language branch of the Tibetan-Burmese language group of the Sino-Tibetan language family. The local dialects have little difference and generally can talk to each other. There are no words in the Pumi people. The Pumi people in Ninglang and Muli used to spell the Pumi language in Tibetan language to record historical legends and songs, but they are not popular and are now widely used in Chinese. The Pumi people live in a multi-clan, mostly on the mountainside, and the houses are mostly the layout of the wooden courtyard. The Pumi people have their own unique culture and art. Among them, the myths, legends and stories are the most numerous. The Pumi people can sing and dance. In the event of a wedding or funeral festival, a "song to the song" competition is held. Pumi men also like sports such as shooting, archery, wrestling, and martial arts. The most popular national traditional festival of the Pumi is the "Ohwa Festival" (the New Year) on the eighth day of the twelfth lunar month. In addition, there is the "Turning Sea Festival" on the 15th of the first month, and the "Taste of the New Festival" in the spring and autumn harvest season.

Cuisine 
Salad of Jidou Pea Jelly
Salad of Jidou pea jelly is a traditional food that Naxi loves. It is produced in Lijiangba and belongs to the yellow bean family. Because it is shaped like a chicken head, it is called chicken pea powder. The beans are milled into vermicelli, the color is gray-green, fried, the salad is very tasty, and the fragrance is delicious. It is a dish on the Naxi table.

Lijiang Baba
Lijiang Baba is the local fine wheat noodles, plus ham, chemical oil, sugar and other condiments, and mix thoroughly to form a layer. Eat a golden crisp, sweet and delicious, oily but not greasy.

Naxi Barbecue
Naxi barbecue is a traditional carbace dish popular on Lijiang Tea Horse Road. The main ingredient is pork belly. The skin is golden and crisp, fat but not greasy, thin and not firewood, and the taste is crisp.

Crossing-the-Bridge Noodles
Crossing-the-Bridge Noodles is a rice noodle soup from the Yunnan province, it has over 100 years of history. The dish is served with a large bowl of boiling hot broth and the soup ingredients. The soup is made with chicken, pork bone and seasoning, such as Chinese star anise and ginger. Also, using a layer of chicken fat to insulate the soup and therefore keep it warm for longer.

Erkuai
Erkuai is a type of rice cake, the name literally means "ear piece," a reference to the shape of one of its common forms. It is often served stir-fried with vegetables, and málà sauce, which is a mixture of dried red chilis, Sichuan pepper, and salt.

Transportation

Airport
There is an airport shuttle bus service in downtown Lijiang. The airport was opened in July 1995 and has flights to Kunming, Chengdu, Xishuangbanna, Beijing, Shanghai, Guangzhou, Wuhan, Shenzhen, Xiamen via Chongqing and Guiyang. It also offers chartered airplane service. There are flights from Kunming to Lijiang every day and is about 30 minutes flight time.

Road
G5611 Dali–Lijiang Expressway
 There are bus services to, amongst others, Kunming (8 hrs), Dali (3 hrs), the Tiger Leaping Gorge and Shangri-La.
 Lijiang has several bridges over the Jinsha River, including the Jinlong Bridge, built in 1936, the oldest over the Yangtze.

Railway
Lijiang railway station is currently the terminus of the Dali–Lijiang railway, which heads south. The Lijiang–Shangri-La railway, currently under construction, will extend this line north to Shangri-La.
 There is a train service to Kunming with one overnight and two day trains, and one day train to Dali.
 As of early 2019, a high speed train linking Lijiang to Kunming was introduced. Three pairs of high speed trains are operated between Lijiang railway station and Kunming railway station / Kunming South railway station. It takes around 3–3.5 hours to finish the journey and the ticket fare is CNY 197–220 for a second class seat. 
 There are over 5 pairs of conventional speed trains running between Lijiang and Kunming. A hard sleeper costs CNY 186.5.
 The Lijiang–Shangri-La railway from Lijiang to Shangri-La is expected to open in late 2021.

Tram
Line 1 of Lijiang Tram started construction in October 2019.

Major tourist attractions

Old Town of Lijiang 

Old Town of Lijiang is a national historical and cultural city. It was built in the late Song dynasty (late 13th century AD). It is located in the middle of Lijiang Dam. It is the most preserved and most Naxi-style ancient town in China. It is located in the Yunnan-Guizhou Plateau. At an altitude of 2,416 meters, the city covers an area of 3.8 square kilometers. In December 1997, it was included in the “World Cultural Heritage” list by the UNESCO World Heritage Committee.

Lugu Lake 
Lugu Lake is 2,680 meters above sea level, with an area of more than 50 square kilometers. The average lake depth is 45 meters and the deepest is 93 meters. The lake is clear and blue, with a visibility of 12–14 meters. It is one of the deepest freshwater lakes in China.

Jade Dragon Snow Mountain 

Jade Dragon Snow Mountain is located between 100°4′2”-100°16’30” east longitude and 27°3’2”-27°18’57” north latitude. The scenic area is 415 square kilometers. The main peak fan is 5,596 meters above sea level. It has snow all year round and develops the temperate maritime glaciers closest to the equator in the Eurasian continent. Jade Dragon Snow Mountain is called "Oulu" in Naxi, meaning silvery mountain rock. Its silver-packed, 13 snow peaks are endless, just like a "dragon" flying over the clouds, it is called "Jade Dragon." Because its lithology is mainly limestone and basalt, it is black and white, so it is also called "black and white snow mountain". She is the mountain of the hearts of the Naxi people. It is said that the Naxi people protect the gods of the "three more" incarnation.

The Laojun Mountain 
The Laojun Mountain is a combination of the three national-level scenic spots in the Jade Dragon Snow Mountain, the Three Rivers Concurrent, and the Cangshan Erhai Lake. It is an important part of the Yulong Snow Mountain Scenic Area. This scenic spot is mainly composed of Laojunshan Jiujiu Longtan, Jinsi Factory Jinshan Yuhu, Dawn Meile Danxia Landform, New Main Natural Alpine Botanical Garden and other areas (attractions), with a total area of 715 square kilometers, which is under planning and development. Ecotourism resort. It echoes with the Jade Dragon Snow Mountain and forms the east and west wings of Lijiang's tourism resources.

Nearby
Some 35 kilometers north of Lijiang is the Baishui Terrace, an area where spring water flows over a sinter terrace, leaving behind travertine.

Fifteen kilometers north of Lijiang is the village of Baisha, famous for the Baisha Fresco and the Naxi Hand-made Embroidery Institute. The Fresco was built in the Ming dynasty 600 years ago, the Naxi Hand-made Embroidery Institute was built 800 years ago, it is the headquarters of the Naxi embroideries and also, a school for the Naxi embroiderers. There are many Naxi embroidery masters, teachers, students and local farmers there. Their embroidery arts can be found there.

Education
Lijiang Teachers College and Lijiang Culture and Tourism College are located in Lijiang. The latter was a branch of Yunnan University (YNU). At one point the teacher's college merged into YNU.

Sister cities

  Kazan, Tatarstan, Russia
  Roanoke, Virginia, United States
  New Westminster, British Columbia, Canada
  Takayama, Gifu, Japan 
  Shepparton, Victoria, Australia
  Whanganui, New Zealand
  Preah Vihear Province, Cambodia

See also
 Riding Alone for Thousands of Miles: a film by Zhang Yimou which takes place in the Lijiang area
 Resort town

References

External links

Lijiang City Official website

Lijiang Overview and Travel Guide

 
Cities in Yunnan